Environmental sampling techniques are used in biology, ecology and conservation as part of scientific studies to learn about the flora and fauna of a particular area and establish a habitat's biodiversity, the abundance of species and the conditions in which these species live amongst other information. Where species are caught, researchers often then take the trapped organisms for further study in a lab or are documented by a researcher in the field before the animal is released. This information can then be used to better understand the environment, its ecology, the behaviour of species and how organisms interact with one another and their environment. Here is a list of some sampling techniques and equipment used in environmental sampling:

Quadrats - used for plants and slow moving animals

Techniques for Birds and/or Flying Invertebrates and/or Bats 
Malaise Trap
Flight Interception Trap
Harp Trap
Robinson Trap
Butterfly Net
Mist Net

Techniques for Terrestrial Animals 
 Transect
Tullgren Funnel - used for soil-living arthropods
Pitfall Trap - used for small terrestrial animals like insects and amphibians
Netting techniques for terrestrial animals
Beating Net - used for insects dwelling in trees and shrubs
Sweep Netting - used for insects in grasses
Aspirator/Pooter - used for insects
Camera Trap - used for larger animals
Sherman Trap - used for small mammals

See also 

 Insect Collecting
 Wildlife Biology
 Sampling

Sources 

Scientific method
Survey methodology
Scientific observation
Biological techniques and tools